Cyanothamnus penicillatus is a plant in the citrus family, Rutaceae and is endemic to the south-west of Western Australia. It is a low, spreading shrub with pinnate leaves and white flowers with four petals and eight stamens.

Description
The eight stamens are slightly hairy and there is a very short point on the end of the anthers. Flowering occurs mainly from October to November.

Taxonomy and naming
This species was first formally described in 1863 by George Bentham who gave it the name Boronia penicillata in Flora Australiensis from a specimen collected by James Drummond. In a 2013 paper in the journal Taxon, Marco Duretto and others changed the name to Cyanothamnus anemonifolus on the basis of cladistic analysis. The specific epithet (penicillatus) is derived from the Latin word penicillum meaning "little tail", "painter's brush" or "tuft".

Distribution and habitat
This boronia grows in sand and has a disjunct distribution between Toodyay and the Fitzgerald River.

Conservation
Cyanothamnus penicillatus is classified as "not threatened" by the Western Australian Government Department of Parks and Wildlife.

References

penicillatus
Flora of Western Australia
Plants described in 1863
Taxa named by George Bentham